George Schetky (June 1, 1776 – 1831) was an American composer. Schetky was a violoncellist, music teacher, conductor, and one of the first American composers. He was also a music publisher with Benjamin Carr as his partner.

Born in Edinburgh, Scotland, he emigrated to Philadelphia in 1787.   In 1812, Schetky returned to Scotland, in protest to the War of 1812 since the war was against his native country. He returned to Philadelphia after the war in 1817.

He was one of the founding members of The Musical Fund Society.

Publications
The Musical Journal for the Piano Forte.

References

1776 births
1831 deaths
American male composers
American composers
American cellists
American conductors (music)
American male conductors (music)
American music publishers (people)
Scottish emigrants to the United States